The 10th Tejano Music Awards were held in 1990. They recognized accomplishments by musicians from the previous year. The Tejano Music Awards is an annual awards ceremony recognizing Tejano music musicians.

Award winners

Vocalists of The Year 
Male Vocalist of The Year
David Marez
Female Vocalist of The Year
Selena

Vocal Duo Of the Year 
Joe Lopez, Jimmy Gonzalez and Mazz

Albums of the Year 
Orchestra (Breaking the Rules by Latin Breed)
Conjunto (Emilio by Emilio Navaira)

Songs of The Year 
Song of The Year
Ahora Quiero Que Me Quieras by Mazz
Single of The Year
Ay Mujer by Latin Breed

Entertainers of the Year 
Male Entertainer of The Year
Emilio Navaira
Female Entertainer of The Year
Selena

Most Promising Band of The Year 
Emilio Navaira

Song-writer of The Year 
Joe Lopez

Tejano Gospel Music Artist 
Paulino Bernal

See also 
Tejano Music Awards

References 

Tejano Music Awards
Tejano Music Awards by year
Tejano Music Awards
Tejano Music Awards